Cecil Victor Jenkinson (15 May 1891 – 6 November 1980) was an English cricketer.  Jenkinson was a right-handed batsman played primarily as a wicketkeeper.  He was born at Ilford, Essex.

Jenkinson made his first-class debut for Essex in the 1922 County Championship against Hampshire at the United Services Recreation Ground, Portsmouth.  From 1922 to 1923, he represented the county in 5 first-class matches, the last of which came against Middlesex.  In his 5 first-class matches, he scored 9 runs at a batting average of 2.25, with a high score of 8.  Behind the stumps he took 4 catches and made 4 stumpings.

He died at Pembury, Kent on 6 November 1980.

References

External links
Cecil Jenkinson at Cricinfo
Cecil Jenkinson at CricketArchive

1891 births
1980 deaths
People from Ilford
English cricketers
Essex cricketers
Wicket-keepers